Debregeasia orientalis, common name yanagi ichigo, is a large shrub belonging to the family Urticaceae.

Description
Branchlets are dark reddish and slender. Leaves are dark green, alternate, oblong- to linear-lanceolate, with dark reddish petioles. Inflorescences show many globose glomerules, 3–5 mm in diameter. The fruits are edible and can be used to make wine.

Distribution
This species is native to Bhutan, north eastern India, Nepal, China, Taiwan and Japan.

Gallery

References

 Chen, C.-C. 1991. A new species of Debregeasia (Urticaceae-Boehmerieae) from Asia and a new record of D. wallichiana for China. Novon 1:56–57. 
 Iwatsuki, K. et al. 1993 –. Flora of Japan.

External links
 Catalogue of Life
 Zipcodezoo

orientalis
Flora of Asia